The Livers & Lungs EP is a 2003 EP (or mini-album) by the Scottish rock band Aereogramme.

Track listing
 "Indescretion #243" – 3:43
 "Asthma Came Home for Christmas" – 3:54
 "Inhalation Blues" – 4:41
 "Thriller" (Michael Jackson cover) – 4:29

2003 EPs
Aereogramme albums